Arthur Théodore Verhaegen (31 August 1847 in Brussels – 5 September 1917 in Elsene) was a Gothic Revival Belgian architect and a politician of the Catholic Party, one of the founders of Belgian Christian democracy. He was a grandson of the politician and lawyer Pierre-Théodore Verhaegen.

Life

Verhaegen began his career as a civil engineer at Charleroi. In 1872, after his marriage to Claire Lammens, he moved to Ghent and dedicated himself to arts and crafts in the Gothic Revival style. In 1874 Verhaegen joined the Guild of Saint Thomas and Saint Luke, an association for the study and promotion of medieval art, becoming editor of the guild's Bulletin in 1881 and general secretary in 1884. The guild helped shape his attitudes both to social questions and to arts and crafts.

He played an important role in the restoration of the Gravensteen, the former castle of the counts of Flanders in Ghent, and took part in other restoration projects, as well as being involved in the design of two new churches in Ghent. His writings on architecture, history and art history led to an honorary doctorate from the Catholic University of Leuven.

Verhaegen's concern for social questions led to his active involvement in Catholic social congresses, in founding the newspaper Het Volk, and in the early organisation of Christian Democracy. In the 1890s he became a member of the Belgian Parliament for Eeklo.

During the First World War he remained in occupied Belgium, communicating sensitive military information to the government-in-exile. Discovered, he was put to forced labour by the occupier that broke his health. A few days before Verhaegen's death, the exiled King Albert declared him a baron and a grand officer of the Order of Leopold.

Writings
 Les cinquante dernières années de l'ancienne Université de Louvain (1740-1797) (Liège, 1884)
 La manifestation nationale du 7 septembre 1884 à Bruxelles, 1885
 Le service personnel et l'aumônerie militaire, 1886
 L'aumonerie militaire au congrès des oeuvres sociales à Liége, septembre 1887, 1887.
 Beknopt overzicht van enige punten der stadhuishoudkunde
 Une descendance légitime des anciens ducs de Brabant, 1888.
 Monographie de l'église cathédrale du Saint-Sauveur à Bruges (Bruges, 1888)
 L'hôpital de la Biloke à Gand (Ghent, 1889)
 De bijloke van Gent, opgeluisterd met 43 platen geteekend door de Heeren E. Serrure en A. Van Assche, 1889.
 Le cardinal de Franckenberg, archevêque de Malines, 1728-1804 (Bruges, 1889)
 Antisocialistische werkliedenbond van Gent. Beknopt overzicht van eenige punten der staathuishoudkunde lessen gegeven aan de leden van Gent
 Le minimum de salaire, 1892
 Le minimum de salaire dans les adjudications publiques, 1893
 De vakvereeniging, 1895
 De vakvereeniging, met een model van standregelen en den tekst van de nieuwe wet op de vakvereenigingen met beknopten uitleg, 1895
 Dévotions populaires et croyance en Dieu
 Natuurlijke beginselen en wetten en menschelijke wetten, 1899
 A propos du programme ouvrier des catholiques, 1900
 La question scolaire, 1902
 Soixante-quinzième anniversaire de l'indépendance nationale, 1830, 1905
 Het loon. Lecture given in Leuven during the first social week, 1908
 Het jaar 2000 of de Socialisten in werking door Ed. Bellamy ; Uittreksels en bemerkingen
 Toepassing van het katholiek sociaal programma in de werken. Les gegeven te Leuven tijdens de tweede sociale week, in 1909
 Jules Lammens et les oeuvres catholiques. Esquisse biographique, 1909
 Les élections du 22 mai 1910, 1910
 Praktische raadgevingen aan de leiders der arbeiders-vereenigingen, (Les gegeven te Leuven tijdens de derde Sociale Week, in 1910)
 Le suffrage universel pur et simple, 1911
 Eenige lessen over staathuishoudkunde gegeven in 1911 aan de jonge leden van den Antisocialistischen Werkliedenbond van het arrondissement Gent
 Het collectivisme. (Les gegeven te Leuven, tijdens de vierde Sociale week, in 1911)
 Les élections du 2 juin 1912 et la politique libérale, 1912
 Les élections du 24 mai 1914, 1914
 Proposition de loi sur l'affiliation aux unions ouvrières, 1914
 L'État hors de l'École!
 L'hôpital de la Byloke à Gand, monographie publiée sous le patronage de l'État, de la Flandre Orientale et de la ville de Gand
 Les missionnaires belges du Congo,
 Projet de loi relatif à l'amélioration du cours de l'Escaut entre Anvers et le Kruisschans et aux travaux qui en sont la conséquence
 La régie nationale des chemins de fer de l'Etat et l'avant-projet sur l'exploitation des chemins de fer de l'Etat
 Vingt-cinq années d'action sociale

References

Bibliography
 Paul VAN MOLLE, Het Belgisch parlement, 1894-1972, Antwerp, 1972
 Frans-Jos VERDOODT, "Arthur Verhaegen", in: Nationaal Biografisch Woordenboek, vol. XIII, Brussels, 1990.
 Emmanuel GERARD, De christelijke arbeidersbeweging in België 1891-1991, Leuven, 1991.
 Jan DE MAEYER (ed.), De Sint-Lucasscholen en de neogotiek, 1862-1914, (KADOC-studies, nr. 5), Leuven, 1991.
 Jan DE MAEYER, Arthur Verhaegen (1847-1917), de rode baron (Kadoc Studies, 18), Leuven, 1994.
 Philippe VERHAEGEN, Une vie au souffle de l'esprit, 1995.
 Jan DE MAEYER, "Arthur Verhaegen", in Nieuwe encyclopedie van de Vlaamse Beweging, Tielt, 1998.
 Marie-Pierre D'UDEKEM D'ACOZ, Voor Koning en Vaderland. De Belgische adel in het Verzet, Tielt, 2003.

External links
 Arthur Verhaegen in ODIS - Online Database for Intermediary Structures 
 Archives of Arthur Verhaegen in ODIS - Online Database for Intermediary Structures 

1847 births
1917 deaths
Politicians from Brussels
Catholic Party (Belgium) politicians
Gothic Revival architects
Belgian architects
World War I spies
Barons of Belgium